The African Journal of Herpetology is a biannual peer-reviewed scientific journal published by Taylor & Francis on behalf of the Herpetological Association of Africa. It covers research on any aspects of African reptiles and amphibians. According to the Journal Citation Reports, the journal has a 2018 impact factor of 0.429.

Types of papers published
The journal publishes the following types of papers:
Original articles
Short communications
Reviews

References

External links

 Herpetological Association of Africa

Zoology journals
Herpetological literature
Biannual journals
English-language journals
Taylor & Francis academic journals